Thomas Lowth (4 November 1858 – 26 May 1931) was the Member of Parliament (MP) for Ardwick, a constituency in Manchester from 1922 until his death. He was a member of the Labour Party.

Biography
Lowth was born at Billingborough, Lincolnshire on 4 November 1858. Having received elementary school education, he entered the railway service in 1875 and moved to Manchester. He worked on the railway for 23 years, doing various jobs, then became the general secretary of the General Railway Workers' Union in 1898, a trade union he had helped to establish some years earlier
lowth died at the age of 73.

.

References

External links 

1858 births
1931 deaths
Labour Party (UK) MPs for English constituencies
National Union of Railwaymen-sponsored MPs
UK MPs 1922–1923
UK MPs 1923–1924
UK MPs 1924–1929
UK MPs 1929–1931
People from Billingborough